The LG Cup 1999–2000 was a four team cricket ODI tournament held in Kenya. After the round robin stage, the final took place between South Africa and India. Despite only making his international debut in India's opening game of the tournament, Vijay Bhardwaj won the man of the series award. The tournament was dominated by the bowlers, with the best bowling figures being Sunil Joshi's 5 wickets for 6 runs off his full 10 overs, one of the most economical figures of all time. With the bat, no player passed 50 twice in the series and only Ganguly and Lance Klusener made hundreds.

Squads

Points table

Matches

Group stage

Final 

The final took place between South Africa and India on 3 October. India won the toss and sent South Africa into bat. They made 235 from their 50 overs with an innings of 84 from Herschelle Gibbs being the highest. Vijay Bharadwaj took three wickets but perhaps the best spell came from Venkatesh Prasad who bowled 5 maidens in his 10 overs. His namesake, MSK Prasad contributed 63 runs in their chase but it wasn't enough as Jacques Kallis took the final wicket to give the South Africans a 26 run victory.

References

External links
 Tournament home at ESPNcricinfo

1999 in cricket
International cricket competitions from 1997–98 to 2000
Kenyan cricket seasons to 1999–2000
Sport in Nairobi
2000 in Kenyan cricket
International cricket competitions in Kenya
1999 in Kenyan cricket